The Weissfluhjoch is a summit southeast of the Weissfluh situated in the Plessur Range in Graubünden. Since 1932, a funicular railway (the Parsennbahn) leads to its summit from Davos.

On the Weissflujoch are located several laboratories of the Institute for Snow and Avalanche Research, a division of the Swiss Federal Institute for Forest, Snow and Landscape Research (WSL).

Climate

See also
List of mountains of Switzerland accessible by public transport

References

External links 
 Parsennbahn

Mountains of the Alps
Mountains of Graubünden
Tourist attractions in Switzerland
Mountains of Switzerland
Two-thousanders of Switzerland